Mimi & Eunice (pronounced "me-me and you-ness") is a three-panel comic strip about intellectual property problems, irony, hypocrisy, and politics. It is made by American cartoonist, animator and free culture activist Nina Paley.

The strip has simple graphic style. It contains two characters: Mimi (with pointy ears) and Eunice (with floppy ears). It is licensed under Creative Commons Attribution-Share Alike "for lack of a better option". Paley started publishing "Mimi & Eunice" on her blog 9 March 2010, describing characters as "two middle-aged children/baby psychos/heterosexual lesbians".

Description

A prevalent theme in Mimi and Eunice comics is copyright. Copyright is portrayed as being bad in the comics, and supporters of copyright are portrayed in a satirical manner. 

"Mimi and Eunice" comics often portray the hypocrisy of politicians, corporations and average people. The comics show how some politicians  encourage people to exercise their freedom, but get mad when they do so.  It also depicts the hypocrisy of corporations who abuse their workers, and average people who get mad when people follow their advice.

In 2018, Paley published a series of comics depicting trans women as animate penises, which she described as "about modern transactivism".

Releases 
In 2010 the comic book "Misinformation Wants To Be Free" was published. It includes more than 200 full color "Mimi & Eunice" strips.

In 2011 "Mimi & Eunice's Intellectual Pooperty" mini-book was crowdfunded on Kickstarter.com.

Movies
The characters has been starring in the "Minute Memes" series of short ("one-minute") video "memes" about copyright restrictions and artistic freedom made by Paley. Mimi appeared in "EFF Tribute" and both of them appeared in "Credit is Due: The Attribution Song".

Reception 
Richard Stallman praised on his personal website the Mimi and Eunice book "Misinformation" as "great". "Mimi and Eunice" were mentioned positively as example for a Creative Commons licensed web comic and for its political message.

See also
 Information wants to be free

References

External links

 "Mimi & Eunice" official website
 "Mimi & Eunice" in German
 "Mimi i Eunika" in Polish
 Mimi & Eunice explained for English learners, ComicsEnglish.com

American comics
Gag-a-day comics
Comic strip duos
Satirical comics
2010 comics debuts
Comics characters introduced in 2010
American comics characters
Creative Commons-licensed comics
American comedy webcomics
2010 webcomic debuts
2010s webcomics
Webcomics in print